Florida's 113th House District elects one member of the Florida House of Representatives. The district is represented by Michael Grieco. This district covers Miami Beach, Downtown, Little Havana, North Bay Village, and Fisher Island.

References

113
Miami-Dade County, Florida